Chen Chi-nan (born 29 October 1947) is a Taiwanese anthropologist. He led the Council of Cultural Affairs from 2004 to 2006. He was named Director of National Palace Museum in 2018 and served until 2019.

Education
Chen was born in Pingtung County in 1947. He earned a bachelor's degree in geography from National Taiwan Normal University. Chen subsequently received a master's degree in anthropology from National Taiwan University and a doctorate in the subject from Yale University. He then worked as a researcher at the Academia Sinica and taught anthropology at the Chinese University of Hong Kong, and the University of Virginia. After returning to Taiwan, Chen joined the college of humanities and social sciences at National Chiao Tung University, where he later became dean.

Political career
Chen was named the vice chairman of the Council for Cultural Affairs from 1994 to 1997. In January 2002, he was appointed a minister without portfolio in charge of education and culture. Chen became chairman of the Council of Cultural Affairs in May 2004. He and all members of the Executive Yuan led by Frank Hsieh resigned en masse on 24 January 2006.

In 2014, Chen helped Ko Wen-je select the head of Taipei's Department of Cultural Affairs. In July 2018, Chen was named Director of National Palace Museum, succeeding Lin Jeng-yi. Upon taking office, Chen stated that he would pursue Taiwanization of the museum. He mentioned that the museum had not worked to include other cultures present on Taiwan, namely the indigenous peoples present long before Han immigration to Taiwan, and that he would try to diversify the museum's holdings and displays. He left the job in January 2019.

References

Living people
Taiwanese anthropologists
National Taiwan University alumni
Academic staff of the Chinese University of Hong Kong
University of Virginia faculty
Academic staff of the National Chiao Tung University
Yale Graduate School of Arts and Sciences alumni
1947 births
Politicians of the Republic of China on Taiwan from Pingtung County
Taiwanese Ministers of Culture
Directors of National Palace Museum
National Taiwan Normal University alumni
Taiwanese university and college faculty deans